Sir William Clay, 1st Baronet (15 August 1791 – 13 March 1869) was an English Liberal Party politician and considered as a reformist a Radical.

Clay was the son of George Clay, a prominent London merchant and shipowner.

He was elected at the 1832 general election as a Member of Parliament (MP) for Tower Hamlets, and held the seat for 25 years until his defeat at the 1857 general election. He served under Lord Melbourne as Joint Secretary to the Board of Control from 1839 to 1841. On 30 September 1841 he was made a baronet, of Fulwell Lodge in the County of Middlesex.

Clay married Harriet, daughter of Thomas Dickason, of Fulwell Lodge, Twickenham, Middlesex, in 1822. They had several children and lived also at 35 Cadogan Place, Chelsea, Middlesex. Lady Clay died in December 1867. Clay survived her and died in March 1869, aged 77.  His probate was sworn in the c.£20,000-broad bracket of under . He was succeeded in the baronetcy by his son, William.

Family

Sir William Clay, 2nd Baronet married Mariana Emily, daughter of Leo Schuster in 1855. They had no children. He died on 3 November 1877. His widow married Arthur Haliburton, 1st Baron Haliburton.

References

External links 
 

1791 births
1869 deaths
Liberal Party (UK) MPs for English constituencies
UK MPs 1832–1835
UK MPs 1835–1837
UK MPs 1837–1841
UK MPs 1841–1847
UK MPs 1847–1852
UK MPs 1852–1857
Baronets in the Baronetage of the United Kingdom